Karl Robert Saluri (born August 6, 1993 in Kuimetsa, Rapla County) is a former Estonian decathlete.

In April 2016 Saluri earned a personal record score of 8108, enough to pass the qualifying mark for the 2016 Olympics of 8100.  This result beat his previous personal record by 637 points.  Additionally, this result made him the European leader up to that point of the year and earned him honors as the European Athlete of the Month for April, 2016.

In May 2020 he announced his retirement from competitive sports.

In December of 2021, Saluri became the coach of Estonian decathlete Karel Tilga and Chinese heptathlete Zheng Ninali. By April 2022, the athletes were no longer working with Saluri.

International competitions

References

External links

1993 births
Living people
People from Rapla Parish
Estonian decathletes
Athletes (track and field) at the 2016 Summer Olympics
Olympic athletes of Estonia
Georgia Bulldogs track and field athletes
World Athletics Championships athletes for Estonia
Estonian expatriate sportspeople in the United States
Estonian athletics coaches